YO1 Radio is a radio station based in York. It broadcasts a mix of local news, weather, travel and community information alongside music from the 1980s to the present day. Serving the city of York on 102.8 FM, Selby 90.0 FM and surrounding parts of North Yorkshire on DAB+. It takes its name from a district of the YO postcode area covering central York.

History
YO1 Radio launched online on 12th September 2017. 

In February 2018, Ofcom awarded YO1 Radio an FM licence and  the station launched on 102.8 FM at midday on 27th August 2018. The first song played on air was The Superlicks by Party Band.

In 2021 YO1 Radio opened its ‘Live Lounge’. This is a city centre studio which can be found on Goodramgate, in York city centre.  The Live Lounge is used to broadcast some live programmes and interviews as an alternative to the station’s main studios at James Street. It also is used to record local music artists and celebrity interviews.

In the recent article by The Guardian columnist YO1 Radio was described as: “The only acceptable compromise we’ve found is YO1 radio, a local station playing 80s and 90s bangers…”

On 5th September 2022, YO1 Radio announced a new collaboration with local newspaper The York Press. The partnership has been formed to bring  the latest local news from its trusted editorial team.

YO1 Radio is the home of the ‘Griffo in the Morning’, breakfast show for York and North Yorkshire Griffo was previously the breakfast presenter at Minster FM.

Claire Pulpher - a singer, actor, producer and dancer joins YO1 Radio on Monday, February 13, 2023 with her self titled show 'The mid morning show with Claire Pulpher'

YO1 Radio is a sponsor and partner with two of York’s professional sports teams York City Football Club and York City Knights RLFC

On 27th October 2022,  York Barbican and YO1 Radio launched a media partnership.   The partnership will see YO1 radio making announcements of big names coming to York Barbican as well as providing  exclusive interviews with the stars along with associated competitions.

Transmission 
The station transmits on 102.8 FM from a transmitter site at York Hospital. Since July 2021, YO1 Radio has also been available on the MuxCo North Yorkshire digital radio multiplex DAB. YO1 Radio also transmits on 90.0 FM in Selby from Selby Abbey.

On 18 October 2022, YO1 Radio was awarded a Small Scale DAB radio licence  which aims to cover almost all of the City of York and surrounding areas, representing 70% of the population – or 165,000 people. 

In March 2023 YO1 Radio applied to Ofcom for permission to further extend its FM coverage with the addition of a transmitter to serve the Thirsk area.

References 

Community radio stations in the United Kingdom
Radio stations established in 2017
Radio stations in Yorkshire